The San Diego Association of Governments (abbreviated SANDAG) is an association of local San Diego County governments. It is the metropolitan planning organization for the County, with policy makers consisting of mayors, councilmembers, and County Supervisors, and also has capital planning and fare setting powers for the county's transit systems, the San Diego Metropolitan Transit System and North County Transit District, some of which was assumed by the Metropolitan Transit Development Board (became MTS in 1986).

SANDAG, along with the Southern California Association of Governments, are the only metropolitan planning agencies in Southern California.

Governance 
The board was previously governed with the representation of one board member from every city in San Diego County, with each member holding two votes in two systems. The approval of a project required the majority tally vote representing all cities and board members and the majority of represented members weighted by population.

After the passage of SANDAG's reform bill in 2017, any four representatives representing a majority of the county's population can overrule the tally vote.

Programs

Fare payment systems 
The Compass Card was launched by SANDAG in May of 2009 to integrate the fare payment systems of San Diego MTS and North County Transit District into one system, meant to reduce the number of fare transactions at customer service centers. The Compass Card was replaced by PRONTO in September 2021.

See also 
 IE511 neighboring 511 system

References

External links 
 SANDAG · San Diego Association of Governments
 LAO Report March 2006 Assessment of SANDAG's Role in San Diego from the Legislative Analyst's Office

Councils of governments
Government of San Diego County, California
Local government in California
Metropolitan planning organizations